The 1982 All-Big Eight Conference football team consists of American football players chosen by various organizations for All-Big Eight Conference teams for the 1982 NCAA Division I-A football season.  The selectors for the 1982 season included the Associated Press (AP).

Offensive selections

Quarterbacks
 Turner Gill, Nebraska (AP)

Running backs
 Mike Rozier, Nebraska (AP)
 Ernest Anderson, Oklahoma State (AP)
 Marcus Dupree, Oklahoma (AP)

Tight ends
 Jamie Williams, Nebraska (AP)

Wide receivers
 Mike Wallace, Kansas State (AP)

Centers
 Dave Rimington, Nebraska (AP)

Offensive guards
 Paul Parker, Oklahoma (AP)
 Mike Mandelko, Nebraska (AP)

Offensive tackles
 Randy Theiss, Nebraska (AP)
 Karl Nelson, Iowa State (AP)

Defensive selections

Defensive ends
 Kevin Murphy, Oklahoma (AP)
 Reggie Singletary, Kansas State (AP)

Defensive tackles
 Ricky Bryan, Oklahoma (AP)
 Shamus McDonough, Iowa State (AP)

Nose guards
 Gary Lewis, Oklahoma State (AP)

Linebackers
 Jackie Shipp, Oklahoma (AP)
 Mike Green, Oklahoma State (AP)
 Steve Damkroger, Nebraska (AP)

Defensive backs
 Victor Scott, Colorado (AP)
 Ronnie Osborne, Iowa State (AP)
 Demetrious Johnson, Missouri

Special teams

Place-kicker
 Larry Roach, Oklahoma State (AP)

Punter
 Bucky Scribner, Kansas (AP)

Key

AP = Associated Press

See also
 1982 College Football All-America Team

References

All-Big Seven Conference football team
All-Big Eight Conference football teams